Australian rules football in Queensland (typically referred to as "AFL", or less frequently "Australian Football", "Aussie Rules" or "Australian Rules") was the first official football code played in 1866. The Colony of Queensland was the second after Victoria to adopt Australian rules football, just days after there rules were widely published. For two decades it was the most popular football code, however a strong desire for representative football success saw Queenslanders favour British football variants for more than a century. 120 years later in 1986 Queensland was the first state awarded a licence to have a club, the Brisbane Bears, in the national competition, also its first privately owned club. However the Gold Coast based Bears had a detrimental effect until the 1993 redevelopment of the Brisbane Cricket Ground (Gabba). In contrast the Bears transformation into a Brisbane and traditional membership based club resulted in enormous growth, and a tripling of average AFL attendances by 1996.

Queensland has two fully professional teams competing in the Australian Football League: the Brisbane Lions (1996) and Gold Coast Suns (2009). These two teams compete against each other in the QClash.

The sport has surged in South East Queensland and the Cairns Region since the 1990s. The Brisbane Lions threepeat premiership era in the national Australian Football League (AFL) saw a participation boom and a sharp increase in drafted players. The Lions 3 Grand Final appearances in the national women's competition from its inaugural season in 2017 and 2021 premiership helped further fuel female participation despite a lack of success from the Lions and Suns senior men's teams. AFL in Queensland subsequently grew throughout the state. Ausplay puts Australian Football participation in Queensland third after soccer and rugby league, passing rugby union in player numbers in 2018, the first time since the 1890s. However, contrary to reports from the game's governing body, since 2019 the player base declined in contrast to increased numbers for all other football codes. Nevertheless an increasing number of players have found pathways to the elite professional national level. As at 2020 more than 100 Queensland males and almost 50 Queensland females had played at the sport's highest level (AFL/AFLW), however only a dozen have played more than 200 games.

Queensland was the first state to host the AFLW Grand Final (the inaugural 2017 AFL Women's Grand Final) and the second state in history to host the AFL Grand Final (the 2020 AFL Grand Final). AFL Premiership matches are now regularly played in Brisbane, the Gold Coast and Cairns. The AFL began matches in Townsville along with AFLW matches in the Moreton Bay Region, Mackay in the 2010s and the Sunshine Coast and Ipswich in the 2020s.

The state has produced several great players. Zane Taylor holds the record for the number of representative caps for Queensland, though the AFL abandoned senior representation in 1993. Erwin Dornau became the first born and raised Queenslander in the AFL in 1948. Jason Dunstall was the first Queenslander to be inducted into the Australian Football Hall of Fame in 2002 and holds the AFL record of most goals for a Queenslander with 1254, the third highest tally in league history. Dunstall also holds the record AFL games for a player born and raised in the state (269). The state's 3 AFL Brownlow medallists include: Michael Voss, Jason Akermanis and Simon Black while these players were not both born and raised in the state all three are nonetheless multi-premiership players and Australian Football Hall of Famers. In the AFLW, the first Queensland born and raised player to win the league best and fairest is Ally Anderson (second Queenslander after Emily Bates) and shares the record for most games while Tayla Harris has the most goals.

Despite growing popularity and participation, the combined membership of the state's 2 AFL clubs is the lowest of any state and the AFL attracts the second highest media profile of the four major football codes.

History

1860s: Early Beginnings in South East Queensland

Football matches had been played early on in what was known as "Moreton Bay", with some of the earliest evidence dating back to 1849, however it is not known under what rules they played and there were no established codes. The Melbourne Rules were brought to the newly self-governed Colony of Queensland by migrants from the Colony of Victoria and was the first organised code to arrive.

Founder of the code Tom Wills, moved to Queensland along with his father Horatio Wills in October 1861 to work on the family grazing property near Springsure in Central Queensland. While Horatio was killed during the Cullin-la-ringo massacre and Tom returned to Victoria in 1864, his brothers Cedric and Horace (both played at Geelong Football Club) continued their football involvement in Brisbane, as did many other associates of Wills. 

Not long after the redrafting of the laws on the 1st May and the widespread distribution of the Victorian Rules of Football in the Australasian on 19 May 1866 an advertisement appeared in the Brisbane Courier on the 21st May calling for a meeting to form a Brisbane club. The first Brisbane Football Club was incorporated the following day on the 22 May 1866 and chose to play under the then widely distributed Victorian Rules.

Queensland at the time was one of the poorest colonies (especially in comparison to booming Victoria), having begun as a penal settlement it was very much a frontier colony and relied heavily on investment from the southern colonies. With its population of under 90,000 in 1866, it was dwarfed by Victoria's rapidly growing population of 640,000 consisting mostly of migrants from the United Kingdom and New South Wales. Nevertheless Brisbane was the first football club of any code in the colony and the only known club outside of Victoria and New South Wales to have officially adopted Victorian Rules.

The majority of the founders of Brisbane FC had prior exposure to the game during its rapid rise in popularity in Victoria. Of the six founding members four were from Victoria - none were from Queensland. One of three members of the founding committee was Charles Edward Wallen, who had played for Scotch College in the experimental rules matches umpired by Tom Wills in 1858. Tom Board and George Clencross-Smith were both teammates of Tom Wills at Geelong Football Club. Studholme Hart had played in 1859 with South Yarra. Founding chair David Watterston moved from Melbourne to Ipswich in 1860 and was a member of Brisbane's Victorian Cricket Club (formed 1863 and consisting of ex-Victorian players). His cricket club had on 26 May proposed that cricket make way off-season for football. Significantly, on 1 June 1866, the Brisbane Courier published the Melbourne Football Club rules as the official rules for the Queensland colony.

The club played the first of several scratch matches on Saturday 9 June 1866 at Queen's Park (now part of the Brisbane City Botanic Gardens). The first official fixture was played on the 21st July, 1866, and after a marathon 5 hours, the game was declared a draw.  While there were sufficient numbers for scratch matches Brisbane FC struggled early on for competition and at times during its early years switched to Association Football to facilitate matches with early teams like Volunteer Artillery.

Despite the slow start the game began to spread rapidly during the 1870s. By 1870 there were five clubs: Brisbane, Volunteer Artillery, Brisbane Grammar, Civil Service and Ipswich, all adopting the Victorian Rules (as it was then known).

Ipswich Grammar School was the first school in Queensland to adopt football in 1868 care of new headmaster John McCrae of Scotch College in Melbourne. Two years later the first schoolboys match was between Brisbane Grammar and Ipswich Grammar was played. The National School was to join the fledgeling schools competition in 1869. Ipswich Grammar's influence in the code's development was formidable, while the senior clubs went into recess early in the decade due to player numbers, the school continued to fly the flag and by the end of the decade the flow of juniors helped the city of Ipswich become the major stronghold for the code with no less than 7 clubs regularly competing against each other.

1870s: The code spreads north and west

A club also formed in Rockhampton, Capricornia in 1873 to play under Australian rules on the local cricket ground.

By the time rugby was imported from Britain in 1876, Victorian Rules had well established itself as the colony's premier football code. Though in areas outside Brisbane there was growing confusion amongst clubs over which set of rules to adopt, and while some experimented with rugby most simply defaulted to the Victorian rules.

The game had spread to the Darling Downs by 1876 with a match between Civil Service and the newly formed club Toowoomba. As the game spread further west of the Great Divide to places including Warwick clubs were split on whether to adopt rugby. Some of the Downs clubs lacked nearby opponents and appear to have preferred rugby, as a result competition went into recess a few years later until matches were played by Toowoomba Grammar. The code in Brisbane was still dominant and in 1876 several newly formed Brisbane rugby union clubs including Rangers and Bonnet Rouge moved to switch codes citing the game's huge popularity in Melbourne. However Brisbane FC's decision to defect to rugby to join the other two clubs helped establish the rugby code in the state.

Queensland clubs affiliated with the Victorian Football Association (VFA) in 1877, and the game became known in Queensland as the "Victorian Association rules", "Victorian association football" (or sometimes just "Association Football" or "Association rules").

In 1878, the main clubs playing rugby, Rangers and Bonnet Rouge folded, and Brisbane FC, lacking opposition teams returned to Australian rules. Rugby  was left without any clubs in the city. However it was beginning to gain ground in smaller country towns which didn't have the numbers of funds to tour as full Australian Football teams.

Former Brisbane Grammarian and Brisbane FC player Herbert W. Bryant, while playing with Essendon in the VFA had the honour of being the first Queenslander to play for Victoria's team in the first intercolonial Victoria v South Australia (1879).

Competition began in Wide Bay–Burnett in 1881, with the establishment of clubs in Maryborough and Gympie. The Darling Downs competition also expanded to include Allora in 1883 providing more regular interaction between the clubs. Competition in Far North Queensland was recorded as early as August 1884 with the first match in Cairns was played against a representative team from Townsville. An association also began in Charters Towers with the town competing against nearby Millchester in 1885. The code also reached the Mackay Region in 1885 however was short-lived there.

While Victorian Association remained popular, Queensland clubs, particularly the newly formed ones that were beginning to make hard decisions on rule adoption. Many players wanted to represent Queensland and many were convinced that adopting rugby would be the best option for this. Rules to protect players against dangerous pushing during contests for example were desperately sought, and some were claiming that rugby rules were safer as a result. Clubs were becoming increasingly disgruntled by the lack of representation or consultation on the laws of the game and governance from Melbourne.

1880s: Queensland Football Association era

A meeting was held on 30 April 1880 at the Queen's Hotel for the purpose of forming the Queensland Football Association (QFA) to affiliate with the Victorian Football Association. The formation was opposed by the premier Queensland club, the Brisbane Football Club, through its representative E.C. Binge, believing that it had the right to govern itself and use its position of influence to lead the other clubs. However his motion lapsed and the formation proceeded. While there were no dedicated rugby clubs, many of Brisbane and Wallaroo's best players preferred to play both codes so rugby matches were facilitated during the season on a Saturday every 4 weeks. While club rugby was nowhere near as popular with the public, Brisbane FC being by far the strongest club would often field its best players in rugby and its seconds in Victorian Association matches. By 1883 QFA membership consisted of 900 Victorian Association members from throughout the colony and 80 Rugby Union members mostly from Brisbane.

Rugby rebellion: local clubs and schools reject the Victorian Association

Migration trends did no favours for the code with Brisbane's population tripling over the next decade, migration from Victoria was rapidly supplanted by the British Isles and neighbouring New South Wales bringing with them a strong preference toward the British football codes.

A growing rift between Victorian Association and its Rugby Union members came to a head in 1883 after QFA clubs had been pushed annually to vote as to whether to continue under the Victorian Association or adopt Rugby Union rules. Whilst the rugby fraternity was vastly outnumbered (just a handful of rugby clubs compared to more than 50 senior Victorian association clubs), their push for intercolonial matches against New South Wales was enormously popular. There was increasing discontent among all QFA members with Melbourne's apparent disinterest in sending teams to Queensland. The QFA felt that the wealthier Victorian Association were more capable of covering the travel expenses than the Queenslanders, while the Rugby Union members were more than prepared to cover the costs of the shorter trip to Sydney. Rugby players were also disgruntled with having to play under Association rules and were dissatisfied with the Victorian Association's growing contempt for rugby. Under pressure from its members, the QFA organised the first intercolonial to be played under Victorian Rules between New South Wales and Queensland. The two colonies played each other in a two-game series in Brisbane in August 1884 resulting in a 1–1 draw. The first match attracted a modest crowd of 300 spectators and increased interest in the contest resulted in the second match drawing 2,000. Many of the players also played rugby and Queensland rugby footballers began to bypass the QFA to directly organise rugby tests with New South Wales. This angered the QFA and in an effort to uphold Victorian Rules, and with support unforthcoming from Melbourne on the issue, a motion was passed by the QFA secretary that effectively barred players found to be playing Rugby Union from playing at a Victorian Association club, effectively segregating the two codes for the first time since its inception. The move was to backfire as the breakaway Northern Rugby Union (NRU) formed, taking disgruntled clubs and players with it. These clubs in response, instituted the barring of rugby players from playing Victorian rules and Rugby players and officials began derogatively reverting to the term "Melbourne Association" and "Melbourne Rules" in reference to the QFA and its rules fuelling a sentiment of them being increasingly anti-rugby and anti-Queensland.

The lack of a player transfer system was exposed in 1886 when players began freely changing clubs and codes from week to week without accountability, the situation was becoming farcical and supporters quickly lost confidence in the QFA.

Suffering from dwindling numbers, the 1886 Queensland team was humiliated by New South Wales in their intercolonial matches. The Victorian game supporters were struggling hard to uphold the premier position they had gained. In contrast within just two years of its founding, the locally governed breakaway NRU competition came to dominate sport in Queensland and, according to one writer, "The defining moment in the code battle came with the 1886 Queensland [Rugby] side, who defeated NSW for the first time in Sydney. "The success of this team undoubtedly won the day for rugby game in Queensland. After the brilliant performance of the 1886 Queensland rugby team, who lost only one match through their tour, the rugby game became very popular and the next season several new clubs were formed and the Victorian game began to wane".

Australian rules, however, was still strong in the schools. Brisbane Grammar through Richard Powell Francis had switched to rugby in 1885. Though Grammar continued to play Victorian Association matches against Ipswich, it lobbied hard for the other Independent Schools to switch away from them. Perhaps the death blow occurred when Independent Schools headmasters in 1887 voted by 1 vote to adopt rugby. The majority of councillors objected on the basis that the reference of "Victorian" in the name of the sport did not represent the interests of Queenslanders.

Between 1885 and 1887, for the first time in the history of the colony, mainstream newspapers began to report rugby results first, followed by Australian Football and Association Football signalling the premier status of the rugby code. Despite the Victorian Association having 10 times the participation of rugby in terms of players and clubs, regular competitive intercolonial representation was by far the most important to the players and the public, the QFA was just not able to offer this.

1890s: QFA Collapse and the end of an era

Despite the advances made by Queensland football, it was clear that Victoria was progressing faster than any other state while the code in Queensland had been going backwards. In an effort to reverse the decline, the QFA had been calling on the VFA for years to send teams to Queensland to play exhibition matches which were largely ignored. In 1888 it finally secured the first visit from a colonial team slated to be from all of Victoria. However a representative Melbourne team arrived in June 1888. The QFA assembled a Queensland team consisting of players principally from Ipswich topped up with a scattering of players from Brisbane. The match was played at the Brisbane Exhibition Grounds with the home team lost 3–5 to the visitors 6–16 in front of 5,000 spectators. Rugby officials had deferred matches for the event, though noted that both Queenslander players and spectators appeared to have little understanding of the game. Several Melbourne clubs followed shortly thereafter including the Melbourne Football Club.

A representative match between Brisbane and Ipswich was held in June 1890 won by Brisbane 3 goals 6 to Ipswich 3 goals 5.

On 21 June 1890, South Melbourne Football Club toured, playing against Queensland on Albion Park. The result of the match was a complete 6–17 to 1-0 humiliation (behinds were recorded in the scores at the time but did not actually count until 1897). The humiliation was obviously felt by the players as when Queensland defeated a New South Wales Rugby Union team shortly afterwards many of the former rugby players receded from the Australian football ranks and formed clubs of their own.

The Queensland Football Association, already under heavy criticism, folded at the end of the 1890 season. With the gap left by the collapse of Victorian Association, the majority of the Brisbane clubs switched to rugby, while clubs in Ipswich and Toowoomba also switched, folded or joined the ranks of the Anglo-Queensland Football Association. The Australian code quietly disappeared with no clubs surviving the 1890s.

Comeback attempt in Ipswich (1892)
A meeting was held in July 1892 to re-establish the code instigated by the Ipswich Football Club. It was initially successful, with a well attended representative match played between Brisbane and Ipswich staged at the North Ipswich Reserve. Ipswich won 4 goals 12 to 3 goals 7. Optimistic of an Australian rules revival, Ipswich's Athenian Football Club reformed, consisting almost entirely of rugby converts, and contested another high profile match against a reformed Ipswich Football Club at the North Ipswich Reserve, the match won by the Athenians 6 goals 4 to 4 goals 5. Ipswich and Brisbane teams met again in August at Queens Park in Brisbane. While interest remained strong in Ipswich, the rugby dominated Brisbane media appeared disinterested in the return match and the code's comeback attempt failed. Reluctantly the Ipswich and Athenian clubs returned to playing rugby the following year.

1900s: Post-Federation Australasian Rules Revival

With Federation of the colonies Australian rules was to benefit from a renewed interest in Australian nationalism.

A meeting was held in 1900 in an effort to revive the code. However this was made more difficult as rugby interests had rebranded their sport in Queensland as "Australian Football" and soccer was then known as "Anglo-Australian Football", presenting a major branding obstacle. In an effort to differentiate, the new association chose the provisional title for the new league as the rather awkwardly worded "Queensland Association of the Australian Game of Football".

Competition recommenced in 1900 in of all places, Maryborough in Wide Bay, with senior and junior competitions including the Wallaroo club, which had continued to field both Australian rules and rugby teams, and the Victorians club.

The Queensland Football League (QFL) was formed in July 1903 at a meeting with 50 present at the South Brisbane Cycling Club and a total of 150 signed on as members. Unlike the previous league which affiliated with the VFA, this new body decided to affiliate with the Victorian Football League. Practice matches were held in August that year in the Botanical Gardens and attracted large crowds and interest. The first premiership was held in 1904 with most games being played at Queen's Park, a sporting facility within the grounds of the Brisbane Botanic Gardens.

Competition in Ipswich, once the code's stronghold in Queensland was rekindled through an exhibition match between Locomotives and Brisbanes. The Ipswich Football Club was reformed in May 1906 and matches resumed at the North Ipswich Reserve. Several Ipswich clubs and schools resuming to play the sport from the following year including juniors at Ipswich North State School and Newtown schools.
 
From 1905 to 1914 games were regularly played at the Brisbane Cricket Ground. Clubs included Brisbanes, Locomotives, Ipswich, Citys, Valleys and Wynnum.

In 1908, Queensland again sent delegates to the Australasian Football Council, this time, fielding a side in the Jubilee Australian Football Carnival which saw all Australian states as well as New Zealand compete.

The sport was reintroduced to Far North Queensland during both World Wars. In 1913, a team of servicemen briefly existed on Thursday Island.  

In 1914 a carnival to promote the code was held in Brisbane.  The participating teams were Collingwood (representing Victoria), Perth (representing West Australia), South Adelaide (representing South Australia) and Cananore (representing Tasmania).

Between 1915 and 1919 the Queensland Football League went into recess owing to World War I.

Between the Wars: The Game Expands

In August 1927 at a meeting of the Australian National Football Council it was decided that each of the state leagues were to include the words 'Australian National' in their names.  Accordingly, the QFL was renamed the Queensland Australian National Football League (QANFL) and football continued a steady growth in Brisbane.

The first matches in Mount Isa were played in 1932.

A VFL exhibition match was played between powerhouse clubs Carlton FC and Richmond FC at the Exhibition Ground in 1930 drew 12,000 and raised £622 for the clubs.

In 1944, a league of servicemen was formed around the Atherton Tableland.  Teams represented included Wongabel, Wondelca, Kairi, Mareeba and Ravenshoe.

Post War Era: Queensland Football Comes of Age

The late 1940s and early 1950s would see an era of growth.

In 1946, Queensland defeated New South Wales for the first time in interstate football. Unlike the first few decades, matches during the following decades would be close between the two sides increasing the interest in the contests.

Erwin Dornau became the first Queenslander in to play in the VFL in 1948.

With the increasing interest in the code, Brisbane Rugby League administrators began to block access to the Brisbane Cricket Ground for proposed exhibition matches by the VFL leaving only the Brisbane Exhibition Ground for the VFL to play on.

In 1952, the Brisbane Exhibition Ground hosted a VFL match between Essendon and Geelong drew 28,000 spectators and was the first official VFL match to be played under floodlights.

The first recorded women's match was played in 1955 in front of a crowd of 4,000 at Perry Park between the Brisbane Bombers and Sandgate Sirens.

In 1955 a league was introduced to Townsville. Competition also began that year in Cairns and in 1957 land was purchased in Cairns for the first dedicated field and competition began there. In the same year a league was also introduced to Mount Isa.

Another VFL exhibition game was played at the Brisbane Cricket Ground in 1959, attracting a large crowd.

The code boomed at junior level during the 1950s and by 1960, with a tripling of the number of schools playing the code and more than 5,000 juniors playing across the state.

In 1961, the first league commenced on the Gold Coast.

In 1964 the QANFL became the Queensland Australian Football League (QAFL), a limited liability company.

In the early 1970s, the first permanent leagues appeared on the Sunshine Coast (1970) Mackay (1970), the Darling Downs (1971), Bundaberg-Wide Bay (1971) and Rockhampton (Capricornia) (1972).

1980s: Brisbane Bears Era
Born and raised Queenslander Jason Dunstall debuted for the Hawthorn Hawks in 1985 and quickly became one of the greatest players in the game, despite remaining almost unknown in his home state.  He briefly represented a Queensland State of Origin team which played in a low key game against New South Wales in Sydney.

On 1 October 1986 the VFL board was announced that teams from Brisbane (Brisbane Bears) and Perth (West Coast Eagles) would compete in the Victorian Football League (VFL) from 1987.  Much of the Bears team were South Australian players from the South Australian National Football League and Victorians from the Victorian Football League. Although the team was known as Brisbane, home games were played at Carrara Stadium on the Gold Coast, nearly 100 km from Brisbane.

The Bears were hugely unsuccessful on the field, and with the admission of the successful Brisbane Broncos rugby league team into the New South Wales Rugby League, the popularity of Australian rules football plummeted, while the successful Broncos, made up primarily of local talent, thrived.  The NSWRL had resisted the move for a team in Queensland for years but created the Broncos and the Gold Coast-Tweed Giants the very next season.

The admission of the Bears had a deleterious effect on the QAFL which weakened over the following years.

During this era, few local players, besides Jason Dunstall, were produced with the exception of Gavin Crosisca and Marcus Ashcroft who were successful at VFL level.

Demographic trends saw Victorian and South Australians (states where the code is extremely popular) migrating interstate in large numbers to Queensland.  Support for Australian rules football grew, despite a lack of success from the Bears and support from fans.

1990s: AFL comes to Brisbane, New Governing Body
1990 saw the Brisbane Bears receive their first Wooden Spoon, which saw new coach Queensland-born Norm Dare sacked at the end of the season.

1991 was a mixed year for the Brisbane Bears. At the end of the home and away season, the Bears' Seniors team would receive the Wooden Spoon again while the Bears' Reserves team finished in 3rd position. They qualified for the Reserves Grand Final, where they scored a 34-point victory over the Melbourne Demons to become the first team from outside Victoria to win an AFL premiership. The Queensland Independent Schools Australian Football League (QISAFL) began in 1991, the first dedicated league for private schools in the state.

1992 saw the debut for the Brisbane Bears of the most significant locally produced young talent to emerge from the state – Michael Voss.  Although born in country Victoria, Voss spent most of his childhood in Queensland and represented the state at junior level where he shone, before going on to captaining the Brisbane Lions and becoming one of the all-time greats of the game.  Voss was followed by a small number of players from Queensland to find their way into the newly named Australian Football League (AFL).

In 1993, the Brisbane Bears moved from the Gold Coast, to the Brisbane Cricket Ground in the inner-Brisbane suburb of Woolloongabba. Interest, crowds and membership in the team increased considerably.  Games between the Bears and popular Victorian sides Collingwood, Essendon and Hawthorn drew particular interest.

In 1995, the Bears made the AFL finals for the first time.

In 1996, six sell-out games at the Gabba caused the State Government to consider funding re-development of the ground, something that would be done several times over the following years to transform the small stadium into a world-class venue.

After the 1996 season, the QAFL, having weakened significantly with the introduction of the Bears, finally went into receivership.  A new governing body, the Queensland Australian Football Council, was formed in 1997, alongside a new premiership competition, Queensland State Football League (QSFL).

Boom Times: Brisbane Lions Threepeat Era
The Brisbane Lions began in 1996, when the AFL approved a merger between the Brisbane Bears and the formerly Melbourne based Fitzroy Football Club and on-field success increased substantially with the injection of Fitzroy players, further boosting the popularity of the code.

A major breakthrough for was participation by GPS schools in South East Queensland playing the code for the first time since the turn of the century. Previously to this, South East Queensland private schools had been a staunchly rugby union stronghold and many schools did not allow Australian Football to be played as it would compete with rugby for players. John Stackpoole introduced Australian rules to GPS school Nudgee College in 1998, the school was to become a powerhouse in the Independent Schools competition. The Jason Dunstall Cup (senior competition named after champion ACGS product Jason Dunstall) and Clint Bizzel Cup (year 9 named after BBC product Clint Bizzell) was later awarded to the champion school. In subsequent decades all of the prestigious GPS schools (with the exception of St Joseph's Gregory Terrace): Nudgee, BBC, ACGS, Brisbane Grammar, Ipswich Grammar and The Southport School participated at one stage or another in the first division of the Queensland Independent Schools Australian Football League (QISAFL) (Toowoomba Grammar competed in a Darling Downs division of the competition). During these years of competition it became a nursery for AFL players. However the competition struggled to maintain interest in the schools and unlike rugby (and soccer in 1991) it has never become an official Great Public Schools Association of Queensland sport. Many AFL players who attended independent schools, notably: Jason Dunstall, Chris Scott, Jason Akermanis, Clint Bizzell, Clark Keating, Brad Moran, Nick Riewoldt, Steven Lawrence, Tom Williams, Marcus Allan, Scott Clouston and John Williams never had the opportunity to play for their school.

Also in the 1990s, the Cairns league experienced enormous growth financially on the back of gaming, with the Cazaly's social club quickly becoming the largest sporting club north of Brisbane.  The Cazaly's Stadium received lights to play popular night football games and the western stand from the Gabba was transplanted to Cazaly's Stadium, enabling it to host AFL matches.

In 1999, the QSFL also went into voluntary liquidation, being replaced by a new organisation, AFL Queensland (AFLQ) in 2000. The new premiership competition was called the AFLQ State League.  That year, Nick Riewoldt became the first Queensland produced player to be taken as number 1 pick in the AFL Draft, recognised as the best junior talent in the nation.

In 2001, a Women's Footy competition began in earnest.

Three successive premierships for the Brisbane Lions in 2001, 2002 and 2003 saw crowds to Australian Football League matches in Brisbane to grow to an average of over 30,000, and in terms of attendance and membership, the AFL team in 2003 was the most popular team of any football code in the state.  However, despite increasing television ratings and media exposure, Australian rules football remains overall less popular than rugby league and rugby union in the state.

During the Lions premiership years, junior Aussie Rules numbers exploded in South East Queensland, and grew solidly right across the state.

2000s: Period of Stabilisation

From 2005, the growing local State League expanded to two divisions.

A record number of 13 Queenslanders were invited to attend the 2006 AFL Draft camp, representing 18% of the 72 camp invitees.

Although state league crowds have dwindled with the increase in support for the Brisbane Lions AFL team, a healthy crowd of 3,257 saw the Southport Sharks defeat Morningside in the 2005 AFLQ Grand Final at the Gabba, while a crowd of over 3,000 saw the Southport Sharks win back-to-back premierships in 2006 at Carrara.

In 2006, support for the Brisbane Lions waned substantially due to two successive seasons out of the finals. From 2005 to 2006 total memberships decreased from 30,027 to 26,429 and the average home crowd fell from 33,101 to 28,305.

The impact of the Brisbane Lions fall from grace was felt at grassroots level by the sport in Brisbane.  From 2006, the much celebrated Jason Dunstall Cup was no longer contested by its former powerhouse schools – ACGS or BBC.  Most other major private schools ceased playing the sport at the top level.  Despite the decline of school competitions, local junior club numbers continued to grow.

Nevertheless, Queensland performed extremely well in the 2006 AFL Draft with a record 11 recruits, including 8 of the first 32 picks.  Surprisingly, the majority of the movement was in the regional areas, with some picks from previously undrafted regional areas such as Townsville, Toowoomba and Mackay providing AFL talent.

AFL on the Gold Coast

The Gold Coast, where a hole had been left once the Brisbane Bears moved away, had grown to become the 6th biggest urban area with nearly half a million people, many of which had migrated from states where Australian Rules is popular. Several bids were made for a new AFL franchise by the powerhouse Southport Sharks Australian Football Club, including attempts to lure a Melbourne-based club in 2004. Many of these attempts were knocked back due to the city's many failed sporting franchises.  However demographic trends suggested a growing demand for Australian rules football and in 2005 a pre-season practice match between the Brisbane Lions and Essendon drew a healthy audience of 16,591. Following the match, the Australian Football League stepped up efforts to expand into the Gold Coast market.  A series of pre-season games and a home and away match was scheduled at Carrara for 2006.  In response, the rival NRL competition admitted a Gold Coast Titans franchise.  Despite an average crowd of around 10,000 (comparatively low by AFL standards), the AFL officially announced a strategy to include a Gold Coast side in the next 5 years. A bitter turf war with the National Rugby League resulted over the use of Carrara stadium. In the same year, AFL CEO Andrew Demetriou was quoted to declare that the league would compete directly with the NRL for marketshare in Queensland.

In July 2006, with the backing of the local government and the AFL, the Kangaroos did a deal which saw them move their home games scheduled at Manuka Oval in Canberra to play a number of home games at Carrara Stadium on the Gold Coast in 2007. The AFL began a heavily subsidised grassroots participation program and pushed for the number of AFL games, including pre-season matches to steadily increase to ready the region for its own side.  Relocation of the Kangaroos was seen by many to be the safest option for the AFL, and an existing Queensland Government deal prevented use of the Brisbane Cricket Ground for a second Queensland side until 2010.  The AFL's plans were further complicated by growing competition in the market.  The entry of several licences from other sports into the market as well as the proposed expansion of A-League put additional pressure on the league to fast-track the relocation of the Kangaroos.

In December 2007, after two years of resisting the AFL's push for their relocation, the Kangaroos finally officially rejected the AFL's $100 million proposal. This was despite threats from the league to pull financial assistance from the club and cancel the Gold Coast home game agreement if they don't move.  The failure of the AFL to secure a stadium deal for Carrara with the Queensland Government was seen as one of the deciding factors.  A consortium was selected by the AFL in early 2008 and the GC17 set out to make an official bid for the licence with criteria defined by the league.  The Queensland government finally committed to funding for a stadium in early 2009 after which the AFL was granted a provisional licence pending further federal government funding. In 2010 The Gold Coast Suns were created and entered a team in the NEAFL. In 2011 they made their debut playing in the AFL and vindicated the investment in creating the new AFL side by outdrawing the rival football codes on the coast.

2020s: COVID Impacts on Queensland football

Queensland was the first state other than Victoria to host an AFL Grand Final, the 2020 AFL Grand Final held at the Brisbane Cricket Ground.

Apart from affecting the availability of AFL venues, the COVID-19 pandemic had an overall positive effect on the sport in Queensland, both in terms of AFL clubs being based in the state and grassroots participation. At one stage in the 2020 season, all but three AFL clubs (the two South Australian clubs, and Hawthorn) were based in the state.

AFL venues have seen significant recent investment during this time, including the $70 million development of a new AFLW stadium at The Reserve, Springfield, $2.7 million expansion of the Maroochydore Multi Sports Complex, as well as benefiting from the proposed $1 billion redevelopment of the Brisbane Cricket Ground for the 2032 Summer Olympics.

However the first Australian Football International Cup tournament scheduled to be hosted outside of Victoria (on the Sunshine Coast) was cancelled due to COVID, it remained under consideration for a 2023 tournament.

Leagues 
Since 2011 Queensland based teams have competed in the northern division of the North East Australian Football League (NEAFL, also contested by teams from New South Wales, Northern Territory and Australian Capital Territory).

This competition became the first division in the region, while Queensland Australian Football League (former "AFLQ State League", first started in 1903) became the 2nd division.

Men's leagues
 Queensland Australian Football League
 AFLQ State Association
 Masters Australian Football Queensland
 AFL Cairns
 AFL Capricornia
 AFL Darling Downs
 AFL Mackay
 AFL Mount Isa
 AFL Townsville
 AFL Wide Bay

Junior leagues
 AFL Brisbane Juniors 
 AFL Gold Coast Juniors 
 AFL Cairns Juniors 
 AFL Sunshine Coast Juniors 
 Darling Downs Junior Australian Football League 
 Queensland Independent Schools Australian Football League (QISAFL)

Women's leagues
 AFL Queensland Women's League 
 AFL Cairns Women's League 
 AFL Capricornia

Clubs

There are two fully professional football clubs in Queensland, the Brisbane Lions and the Gold Coast Suns who both play in the main national league, the Australian Football League (AFL). They also play (with reserve teams) in the interstate competition North East Australian Football League. Other teams from the region that take part of it are Aspley, Redland and Southport.

The main competition of Queensland, Queensland Australian Football League, has 9 teams participating of it.

Representative Sides

Men's
The Queensland state team, known as the "Maroons" has played interstate representative matches against all other Australian states, as well as selecting State of Origin teams as both Queensland. Queensland's last open appearance was in the 1988 Adelaide Bicentennial Carnival where it lost to Tasmania. In 1993 the after taking over as governing body the AFL Commission merged Queensland with the Northern Territory to create a composite side before disbanding it altogether.

Queensland debuted in 1884 at Queens Park following pressure from rugby members of the QFA to play annual representative matches and the result was a drawn series against New South Wales. After rugby split from the QFA and held its annual NSW vs QLD matches, the team did not regularly compete however in 1888 and 1890 suffered humiliating defeats at the hands of the first visiting Victorian teams. Following this, Queensland was reluctant to compete against the stronger states, and resumed tests with NSW until the Jubilee Australasian Football Carnival in 1908. Queensland sent a team to carnival performing a stirring aboriginal war cry prior to its matches against New Zealand however the team performed poorly, failing to win a game. Its carnival record since has been poor, and it has never won a senior carnival in either division.

Test Matches

Colony of Queensland (Pre-Federation)

State Football Team (Post-Federation)

Interstate Carnivals

In early carnivals Queensland only made rare appearances. It broke its 20-game carnival losing streak in 1933 when it defeated the Australian Capital Territory. This was followed up by another win against the ACT in 1947 and 1950. Queensland achieved a breakthrough when it defeated New South Wales for the first time in the 1958 carnival. However, in the 1960s it was relegated to the "minor states" where it again accounted for New South Wales at the 1968 Minor States Carnival and both New South Wales and ACT at the 1974 Minor States Carnival taking its first Section 2 title. It was not to reappear in the national carnival until the 1979 Perth State of Origin Carnival when it once again accounted for the Australian Capital Territory and claimed the title. It made its last senior appearance at the 1993 State of Origin Championships as a combined Queensland-NT team defeat Tasmania and take out the Section Two title. With the AFL Commission taking over the game nationally it created a concept in which Queenslanders would compete under the banner of the AFL's The Allies along with players from New South Wales, Tasmania, Australian Capital Territory and Northern Territory and the AFL's focus on its national club competition effectively saw the end of Queensland players representing their state of origin. 
 1908 Melbourne Carnival - 0 wins
 1914 Sydney Carnival - 0 wins
 1924 Hobart Carnival - 0 wins
 1930 Adelaide Carnival - 0 wins
 1933 Sydney Carnival - 1 win
 1947 Hobart Carnival - 1 win
 1950 Brisbane Carnival - 1 win
 1958 Melbourne Carnival - 1 win
 1960 Minor States Carnival - 0 win
 1968 Minor States Carnival - 1 win
 1974 Minor States Carnival - 2 wins
 1988 Adelaide Bicentennial Carnival - 0 wins

Inter-league competition
In inter-league matches since 1991, Queensland (QAFL) has defeated both Tasmania and the Australian Capital Territory, and has had some close games including a near-wins against Western Australia.

Regional Representative Sides
Also there are representative sides for areas within Queensland used during inter-league matches with-in Queensland itself. They include:

 North Queensland - represent North Queensland in annual matches against South Queensland since the 2010s
 South Queensland - represent Southern Queensland in annual matches against North Queensland since the 2010s
 Bushrangers – representing the entire South East Queensland region Official Site
 Gold Coast Stingrays – representing the Gold Coast region
 Suncoast Power – representing the Sunshine Coast region Official Site
 Western Taipans – representing the western regions, including the cities of Ipswich and Toowoomba. Official Site
 Northern Raiders – representing the Northern Suburbs of Brisbane and Bribie Island. Official Site

Underage teams
The Queensland Under-16, Under-17 and Under-18 representative sides are known as the Scorpions.

Women's
The state senior women's team is known as the "Sunfire" and competed since 1992 in the AFL Women's National Championship. It last competed in 2015 before the AFL took over the women's sport nationally and disbanded the senior women's championships. Its best results were in the 2001 AFL Women's National Championships and 2003 AFL Women's National Championships where it was named the second strongest women's team behind Victoria.

Girls
Queensland competes at Under 16, Under-17 and Under-18 representative level at the AFL Women's Under 18 Championships.

Principal Venues
The following venues meet AFL Standard criteria and have been used to host AFL (National Standard) or AFLW level matches (Regional Standard).

Historic Venues
 1866 – ca 1890: Queen's Park (now part of the Brisbane City Botanic Gardens); the original Cricket Ground at the 'Green Hills' (now Petrie Terrace)
 1904 – 1912: Queen's Park
 1905 – 1914: Brisbane Cricket Ground, Exhibition Ground
 1920 – 1950s:  Perry Park, Exhibition Ground for some games, including the 1950 interstate carnival
 1959 – 1971: Brisbane Cricket Ground
 1970s – 1980s: Windsor Park
 1987 – 1996: Carrara Stadium (Gold Coast)
 1998 – 2004: Giffin Park

Modern AFL Standard Venues
 2005 -: Brisbane Cricket Ground (City of Brisbane)
 2005 -: Cazaly's Stadium (City of Cairns)
 2010 -: Carrara Stadium (City of Gold Coast)
 2017 -: South Pine Sports Complex (Moreton Bay Region)
 2018 -: Moreton Bay Central Sports Complex (Moreton Bay Region)
 2018 -: Great Barrier Reef Arena (City of Mackay)
 2019 -: Riverway Stadium, (City of Townsville)
 2020 -: Maroochydore Multi Sports Complex, (City of Sunshine Coast)
 2020 -: Fankhauser Reserve (City of Gold Coast)
 2022 -: Bond Sports Park (Field 2) (City of Gold Coast)
 2022 -: The Reserve, Springfield (City of Ipswich)

Audience

Attendance record
 Men's: 37,473 (2019). AFL Brisbane Lions vs Richmond (Gabba, Brisbane)
 Women's: 15,610. (2017) AFLW Grand Final Brisbane Lions vs Adelaide (Metricon Stadium, Gold Coast, Queensland)

Major Australian Rules Events in Queensland
Australian Football League Premiership Season (Brisbane Lions and Gold Coast Suns home games and QClash special fixture)
AFLW Premiership Season (Brisbane Lions and Gold Coast Suns home games)
Queensland Australian Football League Grand Final

Players

Participation
In 2017 Queensland surpassed 250,000 players in 2017 (40% are female). This is more than double the number of participants in less than a decade. By contrast in 2007, there were around 3,300 senior players in Queensland, and in 2009 there were a total of 103,358 participants. Although the overall participation per capita is around 2%, the sport is growing faster in Queensland than any other Australian state.

Past Greats
Over the years, Queensland has produced an array of talent for elite leagues such as the Australian Football League, such as Jason Dunstall, Marcus Ashcroft, Michael Voss, Gavin Crosisca, Scott McIvor, Simon Black, Jason Akermanis, Nick Riewoldt, Danny Dickfos, Mitch Hahn, Dayne Beams, Kurt Tippett, Jarrod Harbrow, David Hale, Sam Gilbert, Daniel Merrett, Che Cockatoo-Collins, Steven Lawrence, Clark Keating, Jamie Charman, Brett Voss, Brad Miller, Mal Michael, Ben Hudson, Matthew Kennedy, David Armitage and Robert Copeland.

AFL Recruitment Zones
Queensland based AFL clubs have priority development access to the Northern Academy Recruitment Zone. As a result, many of the players from these areas end up playing in the AFL with the designated club.

List of Queenslanders who played in the AFL & AFLW

Since the first Queensland player to make the VFL, Erwin Dornau in 1948 more than 180 Queenslanders as at 2020 had played in the VFL/AFL, well over half of them made their debuts in the 21st century.

Men's

Women's

Bibliography
 
 
 John Morton's Queensland Australian Rules Year Book 1960 by John Morton, 1960
 Queensland Team of the Century Football Record Official Programme, AFL Queensland, 2003
 Official Souvenir Programme of Collingwood v South Melbourne, Queensland Australian National Football League, 1935

See also

 AFL Queensland
 Australian rules football in South East Queensland
 List of Australian Football Leagues in Queensland
 Brisbane Australian Football Club
 1961 Brisbane Carnival

References

External links
Queensland Team of the Century (from Full Points Footy)
QAFF – Queensland footy history group

 
Queensland
History of Australian rules football